Janet Tavakoli is the president of Tavakoli Structured Finance, Inc., a Chicago-based consulting firm. She has had three books published on credit derivatives, structured finance, and the 2008 global financial crisis.

Education and background
Janet is the daughter of a surgeon from Wisconsin and a nurse from Buffalo, New York. Her father died when she was 12. She grew up on the south side of Chicago and Oak Brook, Illinois, and received a bachelor's degree in chemical engineering from the Illinois Institute of Technology in 1975.

Just after graduating in 1975, she married an Iranian Ph.D. student and became Janet Tavakoli. The Tavakolis lived in Iran for over a year during the time the Shah was overthrown, leaving in 1979, three months after Ayatollah Khomeini returned. Janet then returned to the US, but her husband remained in Iran. They divorced after five years of marriage. Back in the US she worked as an engineer while studying at the University of Chicago Booth School of Business where she received an MBA in finance in 1981.

Career
Tavakoli has worked in finance since completing her M.B.A. in 1981. She has traded, structured, and sold derivatives and structured products in both New York and London. In addition, she has held senior positions in the global financial markets division at Westdeutsche Landesbank in London, the capital markets group for Bank One in Chicago, the Swap (finance) trading desk and mortgage-backed securities marketing for Merrill Lynch in New York, and MBS marketing to Japanese clients for PaineWebber (now UBS) in New York. She has also worked for Bear Stearns, Goldman Sachs, Salomon Brothers, and Bank of America.

She taught "Derivatives: Futures, Forwards, Options and Swaps" at the University of Chicago Booth School of Business as adjunct associate professor of finance.

Warnings about the financial industry
Tavakoli started warning of dangers in the financial industry in the 1990s. Her book Credit derivatives: a guide to instruments and applications, published in 1998 warned about documentation risk and information asymmetry creating economic distortions. She has often criticized the International Swaps and Derivatives Association.
Her 2003 book Collateralized debt obligations and structured finance warned about bad ratings and corrupt structures. These CDOs caused the virtual bankruptcy of AIG during the financial crisis in September 2008 (after which AIG received a massive bailout at taxpayer expense). In 2011 she unofficially "revoked" the designation as Nationally Recognized Statistical Rating Organizations of the ten rating agencies having that status, on grounds that they do not deserve it.

Writing
Tavakoli's book Dear Mr. Buffett: What an Investor Learns 1,269 Miles From Wall Street (2009) uses her discussions with Warren Buffett on credit derivatives and structured finance as context for analyzing the global financial meltdown of 2008. The discussions began after Buffett invited her to lunch after receiving a copy of her book Credit Derivatives and Synthetic Structures (1998, 2001). This book, along with her Collateralized Debt Obligations and Structured Finance: New Developments in Cash and Synthetic Securitization (2003, re-published as Structured Finance and Collateralized Debt Obligations: Developments in Cash and Synthetic Securitization in 2008), outlines flaws in the methodology for rating structured financial products.

She has also written articles for The Wall Street Journal, Financial Times, Business Week, and other financial publications.

Her first novel, Archangels: Rise of the Jesuits was published in 2013.

Criticism of TARP
Tavakoli is an outspoken critic of the 2008 Troubled Asset Relief Program (TARP) for financial institutions. She points out that many decisions made appear to favour companies with connections to government officials making the decisions. In particular, she criticizes the Federal Reserve Bank of New York, headed by Timothy Geithner at the time, for deciding to pay Goldman Sachs and other financial firms 100 cents on the dollar for billions of dollars of troubled AIG credit default swaps, while other bond insurers have settled similar contracts for as little as ten cents on the dollar. AIG had been trying to persuade the banks to settle for a discount of 40 cents on the dollar.

Henry Paulson, the prime architect of the bailout, was CEO of Goldman Sachs at the time those CDS agreements were entered into. Geithner was later appointed Treasury Secretary by the Obama administration.

Works
Credit derivatives: a guide to instruments and applications, Wiley, 1998, 
Credit derivatives & synthetic structures: a guide to instruments and applications, John Wiley and Sons, 2001, 
Collateralized debt obligations and structured finance: new developments in cash and synthetic securitization, John Wiley and Sons, 2003, 
 Dear Mr. Buffett: what an investor learns 1,269 miles from Wall Street, John Wiley and Sons, 2008, 
Structured Finance and Collateralized Debt Obligations: New Developments in Cash and Synthetic Securitization, John Wiley & Sons, 2008, 
Novels
Archangels: Rise of the Jesuits (2013)

Notes

External links
 
 BusinessWeek Article
 University of Chicago Magazine Article

C-SPAN Q&A interview with Tavakoli, April 19, 2009

1953 births
Living people
American finance and investment writers
21st-century American novelists
American women novelists
Illinois Institute of Technology alumni
University of Chicago Booth School of Business alumni
21st-century American women writers
People from Oak Brook, Illinois
American women non-fiction writers
21st-century American non-fiction writers